Brainly is a company based in Kraków, Poland, with headquarters in New York City. It is a forum for asking and answering homework questions. , Brainly reported having 350 million monthly users, making it the world's most popular education app.  



History

Initially called Zadane.pl, the company was founded in 2009 in Poland by Michał Borkowski (current chief executive officer), Tomasz Kraus, and Łukasz Haluch. The first million unique monthly users were achieved within 6 months after the release. 

In January 2011, the company founded Znanija.com, the first international project dedicated to Russian language speakers. Several other versions in multiple languages for the following markets included Turkey (eodev.com), Latin America and Spain (brainly.lat), and Brazil (brainly.com.br). 

Brainly was initially funded by the co-founders, but raised funds from Point Nine Capital in 2012. 

In December 2013, seven new language versions of Brainly were released, including English, Indonesian, Indian and more.

In October 2014, the company announced that it had raised another round of funding from General Catalyst Partners, Runa Capital, and other venture capital firms. The total amount of the investment was $9 million, and the company opened headquarters in New York City.

In May 2016, another funding round of $18 million of combined debt and equity was disclosed. In June 2016, Brainly acquired the US-based OpenStudy.

In March or April 2017, Zadane.pl changed to Brainly.

In October 2017, Brainly raised $14 million in a funding round led by Kulczyk Investments.

In January 2018, Brainly announced it had acquired the video education start-up, Bask, to bring video technology to the Brainly platform. 

In July 2019, Brainly raised $30 million in a Series C funding round led by Naspers, with participation from Runa Capital and Manta Ray.

In 2020, the company experienced a significant increase in the number of users, caused by the global COVID-19 pandemic, from 150 million in 2019 to around 350 million in 2020.

In 2020, numerous users on the Art of Problem Solving website found that Brainly had compromised the integrity of the American Mathematics Competitions after posting the questions on its website with the correct answers. This led to Brainly updating its honor code.

Platform

Overview 

Brainly provides a platform where students, parents, and teachers help others with homework questions. The website is intended to strengthen student's skills across subjects such as English, mathematics, science, and social studies. The platform is utilises a peer-to-peer system where students can ask questions, and answer them for other students. Ranks are provided to students who provide high-quality answers. Users are asked to provide an explanation and a source for the answers they provide. Questions are categorized by subject, respective of country and school level. Each user is given a fixed amount points upon registration, which are used to ask questions. Users can gain points by answering questions posted by others. A leaderboard exists for users who have answered the most questions or earned the most points.

Brainly is moderated by both volunteers and staff and uses machine learning algorithms to filter its Knowledge Base. Moderators are trained users whose answers are excellent in content quality. Moderators are given permissions to respond to users who violate rules, including individuals who plagiarize, post spam, or post assessment questions.

Criticism
ToS;DR (Terms of Service; Didn't Read), a project which analyzes terms of services (ToS) and privacy policies of websites, ranks Brainly at grade E.

See also
Economy of Poland
Common Sense Education
Oklahoma Watch: Students find shortcuts, cheats as virtual schooling drags on in pandemic
Is Brainly a tutoring solution, or the next level of cheating?

References

Companies based in New York City
American social networking websites
Internet properties established in 2009
Online companies of Poland
Gamification
Educational technology companies of the United States
Subscription services
Education companies of Poland
Polish Limited Liability Companies
Question-and-answer websites

